A glider or sailplane is a type of glider aircraft used in the leisure activity and sport of gliding (also called soaring). This unpowered aircraft can use naturally occurring currents of rising air in the atmosphere to gain altitude. Sailplanes are aerodynamically streamlined and so can fly a significant distance forward for a small decrease in altitude.

In North America the term 'sailplane' is also used to describe this type of aircraft. In other parts of the English-speaking world, the word 'glider' is more common.

Types 

Gliders benefit from producing the least drag for any given amount of lift, and this is best achieved with long, thin wings, a slender fuselage and smooth surfaces with an absence of protuberances. Aircraft with these features are able to soar – climb efficiently in rising air produced by thermals or hills. In still air, sailplanes can glide long distances at high speed with a minimum loss of height in between.

Sailplanes have rigid wings and either skids or undercarriage. In contrast hang gliders and paragliders use the pilot's feet for the start of the launch and for the landing. These latter types are described in separate articles, though their differences from sailplanes are covered below. Sailplanes are usually launched by winch or aerotow, though other methods, auto tow and bungee, are occasionally used.

These days almost all gliders are sailplanes, but in the past many gliders were not. These types did not soar. They were simply engine-less aircraft towed by another aircraft to a desired destination and then cast off for landing. The prime example of non-soaring gliders were military gliders (such as those used in the Second World War). They were often used just once and then usually abandoned after landing, having served their purpose.

Motor gliders are gliders with engines which can be used for extending a flight and even, in some cases, for take-off. Some high-performance motor gliders (known as "self-sustaining" gliders) may have an engine-driven retractable propeller which can be used to sustain flight. Other motor gliders have enough thrust to launch themselves before the engine is retracted and are known as "self-launching" gliders. Another type is the self-launching "touring motor glider", where the pilot can switch the engine on and off in flight without retracting the propeller.

History 

Sir George Cayley's gliders achieved brief wing-borne hops from around 1849. In the 1890s, Otto Lilienthal built gliders using weight shift for control. In the early 1900s, the Wright Brothers built gliders using movable surfaces for control. In 1903, they successfully added an engine.

After World War I gliders were first built for sporting purposes in Germany. Germany's strong links to gliding were to a large degree due to post-World War I regulations forbidding the construction and flight of motorised planes in Germany, so the country's aircraft enthusiasts often turned to gliders and were actively encouraged by the German government, particularly at flying sites suited to gliding flight like the Wasserkuppe.

The sporting use of gliders rapidly evolved in the 1930s and is now their main application. As their performance improved, gliders began to be used for cross-country flying and now regularly fly hundreds or even thousands of kilometres in a day if the weather is suitable.

Design 
Early gliders had no cockpit and the pilot sat on a small seat located just ahead of the wing. These were known as "primary gliders" and they were usually launched from the tops of hills, though they are also capable of short hops across the ground while being towed behind a vehicle. To enable gliders to soar more effectively than primary gliders, the designs minimized drag. Gliders now have very smooth, narrow fuselages and very long, narrow wings with a high aspect ratio and winglets.

The early gliders were made mainly of wood with metal fastenings, stays and control cables. Later fuselages made of fabric-covered steel tube were married to wood and fabric wings for lightness and strength. New materials such as carbon-fiber, fiber glass and Kevlar have since been used with computer-aided design to increase performance. The first glider to use glass-fiber extensively was the Akaflieg Stuttgart FS-24 Phönix which first flew in 1957. This material is still used because of its high strength to weight ratio and its ability to give a smooth exterior finish to reduce drag. Drag has also been minimized by more aerodynamic shapes and retractable undercarriages. Flaps are fitted to the trailing edges of the wings on some gliders to optimise lift and drag at a wide range of speeds.

With each generation of materials and with the improvements in aerodynamics, the performance of gliders has increased. One measure of performance is the glide ratio. A ratio of 30:1 means that in smooth air a glider can travel forward 30 meters while losing only 1 meter of altitude. Comparing some typical gliders that might be found in the fleet of a gliding club – the Grunau Baby from the 1930s had a glide ratio of just 17:1, the glass-fiber Libelle of the 1960s increased that to 36:1, and modern flapped 18 meter gliders such as the ASG29 have a glide ratio of over 50:1. The largest open-class glider, the eta, has a span of 30.9 meters and has a glide ratio over 70:1. Compare this to the Gimli Glider, a Boeing 767 which ran out of fuel mid-flight and was found to have a glide ratio of 12:1, or to the Space Shuttle with a glide ratio of 4.5:1.

High aerodynamic efficiency is essential to achieve a good gliding performance, and so gliders often have aerodynamic features seldom found in other aircraft. The wings of a modern racing glider are designed by computers to create a low-drag laminar flow airfoil. After the wings' surfaces have been shaped by a mould to great accuracy, they are then highly polished. Vertical winglets at the ends of the wings decrease drag and so improve wing efficiency. Special aerodynamic seals are used at the ailerons, rudder and elevator to prevent the flow of air through control surface gaps. Turbulator devices in the form of a zig-zag tape or multiple blow holes positioned in a span-wise line along the wing are used to trip laminar flow air into turbulent flow at a desired location on the wing. This flow control prevents the formation of laminar flow bubbles and ensures the absolute minimum drag. Bug-wipers may be installed to wipe the wings while in flight and remove insects that are disturbing the smooth flow of air over the wing.

Modern competition gliders carry jettisonable water ballast (in the wings and sometimes in the vertical stabilizer). The extra weight provided by the water ballast is advantageous if the lift is likely to be strong, and may also be used to adjust the glider's center of mass. Moving the center of mass toward the rear by carrying water in the vertical stabilizer reduces the required down-force from the horizontal stabilizer and the resultant drag from that down-force.  Although heavier gliders have a slight disadvantage when climbing in rising air, they achieve a higher speed at any given glide angle. This is an advantage in strong conditions when the gliders spend only a small amount of time climbing in thermals. The pilot can jettison the water ballast before it becomes a disadvantage in weaker thermal conditions. Another use of water ballast is to dampen air turbulence such as might be encountered during ridge soaring. To avoid undue stress on the airframe, gliders must jettison any water ballast before landing.

Most gliders are built in Europe and are designed to EASA Certification Specification CS-22 (previously Joint Aviation Requirements-22). These define minimum standards for safety in a wide range of characteristics such as controllability and strength. For example, gliders must have design features to minimize the possibility of incorrect assembly (gliders are often stowed in disassembled configuration, with at least the wings being detached). Automatic connection of the controls during rigging is the common method of achieving this.

Launch and flight 

The two most common methods of launching sailplanes are by aerotow and by winch. The sailplane pilot releases the rope after reaching the desired altitude. However, the rope can be released by the towplane also in case of emergency. Winch launching uses a powerful stationary engine located on the ground at the far end of the launch area. Less often, automobiles are used to pull sailplanes into the air, either by pulling them directly or through the use of a reverse pulley in a similar manner to the winch launch. Elastic ropes (known as bungees) are occasionally used at some sites to launch gliders from slopes, if there is sufficient wind blowing up the hill. Bungee launching was the predominant method of launching early gliders. Some modern gliders can self-launch with the use of retractable engines and/or propellers, which can also be used to sustain flight once airborne (see motor glider).

Once launched, gliders try to gain height using thermals, ridge lift, lee waves or convergence zones and can remain airborne for hours.  This is known as "soaring". By finding lift sufficiently often, experienced pilots fly cross-country, often on pre-declared tasks of hundreds of kilometers, usually back to the original launch site. Cross-country flying and aerobatics are the two forms of competitive gliding. For information about the forces in gliding flight, see lift-to-drag ratio.

Glide slope control 
Pilots need some form of control over the glide slope to land the glider. In powered aircraft, this is done by reducing engine thrust.  In gliders, other methods are used to either reduce the lift generated by the wing, increase the drag of the entire glider, or both. Glide slope is the distance traveled for each unit of height lost.  In a steady wings-level glide with no wind, glide slope is the same as the lift/drag ratio (L/D) of the glider, called "L-over-D".  Reducing lift from the wings and/or increasing drag will reduce the L/D allowing the glider to descend at a steeper angle with no increase in airspeed.  Simply pointing the nose downwards only converts altitude into a higher airspeed with a minimal initial reduction in total energy. Gliders, because of their long low wings, create a high ground effect which can significantly increase the glide angle and make it difficult to bring the glider to Earth in a short distance.
Sideslipping A slip is performed by crossing the controls (rudder to right with ailerons to left, for example) so that the glider is no longer flying aligned with the air flow.  This will present one side of the fuselage to the air-flow significantly increasing drag. Early gliders primarily used slipping for glide slope control.
Spoilers Spoilers are movable control surfaces in the top of the wing, usually located mid-chord or near the spar which are raised into the air-flow to eliminate (spoil) the lift from the wing area behind the spoiler, disrupting the spanwise distribution of lift and increasing lift-induced drag.  Spoilers significantly increase drag.
Air brakes Air brakes, also known as dive brakes, are devices whose primary purpose is to increase drag.  On gliders, the spoilers act as air brakes.  They are positioned on top of the wing and below the wing also. When slightly opened the upper brakes will spoil the lift, but when fully opened will present a large surface and so can provide significant drag.  Some gliders have terminal velocity dive brakes, which provide enough drag to keep its speed below maximum permitted speed, even if the glider were pointing straight down. This capability is considered a safer way to descend without instruments through cloud than the only alternative which is an intentional spin.
Flaps Flaps are movable surfaces on the trailing edge of the wing, inboard of the ailerons. The primary purpose of flaps is to increase the camber of the wing and so increase the maximum lift coefficient and reduce the stall speed. Another feature that some flapped gliders possess is negative flaps that are also able to deflect the trailing edge upward a small amount. This feature is included on some competition gliders in order to reduce the pitching moment acting on the wing and so reduce the downwards force that must be provided by the horizontal stabiliser; this reduces the induced drag acting on the stabilizer. On some types the flaps and ailerons are linked, known a 'flaperons'. Simultaneous movement of these allows a greater rate of roll.
Parachute Some high performance gliders from the 1960s and 1970s were designed to carry a small drogue parachute because their air brakes were not particularly effective. This was stored in the tail-cone of the glider during flight. When deployed, a parachute causes a large increase in drag, but has a significant disadvantage over the other methods of controlling the glide slope. This is because a parachute does not allow the pilot to finely adjust the glide slope. Consequently, a pilot may have to jettison the parachute entirely, if the glider is not going to reach the desired landing area.

Landing 

Early glider designs used skids for landing, but modern types generally land on wheels. Some of the earliest gliders used a dolly with wheels for taking off and the dolly was jettisoned as the glider left the ground, leaving just the skid for landing. A glider may be designed so the center of gravity (CG) is behind the main wheel so the glider sits nose high on the ground. Other designs may have the CG forward of the main wheel so the nose rests on a nose-wheel or skid when stopped. Skids are now mainly used only on training gliders such as the Schweizer SGS 2–33. Skids help with braking after landing by allowing the pilot to put forward pressure on the control stick, thus creating friction between the skid and the ground. The wing tips also have small skids or wheels to protect the wing tips from ground contact.

In most high performance gliders the undercarriage can be raised to reduce drag in flight and lowered for landing.  Wheel brakes are provided to allow stopping once on the ground.  These may be engaged by fully extending the spoilers/air-brakes or by using a separate control.  Although there is only a single main wheel, the glider's wing can be kept level by using the flight controls until it is almost stationary.

Pilots usually land back at the airfield from which they took off, but a landing is possible in any flat field about 250 metres long. Glide slope control devices are then used to adjust the height to assure landing at the desired point. The ideal landing pattern positions the glider on final approach so that a deployment of 30–60% of the spoilers/dive brakes/flaps brings it to the desired touchdown point. In this way the pilot has the option of opening or closing the spoilers/air-brakes to extend or steepen the descent to reach the touchdown point. This gives the pilot wide safety margins should unexpected events occur. If such control devices are not sufficient, the pilot may utilize maneuvers such as a forward slip to further steepen the glider slope.

Auxiliary engines 
Most gliders require assistance to launch, though some have an engine powerful enough to launch unaided. In addition, a high proportion of new gliders have an engine which will sustain the glider in the air, but is insufficiently powerful to launch the glider. Compared with self-launchers these lower powered engines have advantages in weight, lower costs and pilot licensing. The engines can be electric, jet, or two-stroke gasoline.

Instrumentation and other technical aids 

Gliders in continental Europe use metric units, like km/h for airspeed and m/s for lift and sink rate. In the US, UK, Australia and some other countries gliders to use knots and ft/min in common with commercial aviation worldwide.

In addition to an altimeter, compass, and an airspeed indicator, gliders are often equipped with a variometer and an airband radio (transceiver), each of which may be required in some countries. A transponder may be installed to assist controllers when the glider is crossing busy or controlled airspace. This may be supplemented by ADS-B. Without these devices access to some airspace may become increasingly restricted in some countries. In countries where cloud-flying is allowed, an artificial horizon or a turn and slip indicator are used when there is zero visibility. Increasingly, anti-collision warning systems such as FLARM are also used and are even mandatory in some European countries.  An Emergency Position-Indicating Radio Beacon (ELT) may also be fitted into the glider to reduce search and rescue time in case of an accident.

Much more than in other types of aviation, glider pilots depend on the variometer, which is a very sensitive vertical speed indicator, to measure the climb or sink rate of the plane. This enables the pilot to detect minute changes caused when the glider enters rising or sinking air masses. Most often electronic 'varios' are fitted to a glider, though mechanical varios are often installed as back-up. The electronic variometers produce a modulated sound of varying amplitude and frequency depending on the strength of the lift or sink, so that the pilot can concentrate on centering a thermal, watching for other traffic, on navigation, and weather conditions. Rising air is announced to the pilot as a rising tone, with increasing pitch as the lift increases. Conversely, descending air is announced with a lowering tone, which advises the pilot to escape the sink area as soon as possible. (Refer to the variometer article for more information).

Variometers are sometimes fitted with mechanical or electronic devices to indicate the optimal speed to fly for given conditions. The MacCready setting can be input electronically or adjusted using a ring surrounding the dial. These devices are based on the mathematical theory attributed to Paul MacCready though it was first described by Wolfgang Späte in 1938. MacCready theory solves the problem of how fast a pilot should cruise between thermals, given both the average lift the pilot expects in the next thermal climb, as well as the amount of lift or sink encountered in cruise mode. Electronic variometers make the same calculations automatically, after allowing for factors such as the glider's theoretical performance, water ballast, headwinds/tailwinds and insects on the leading edges of the wings.

Soaring flight computers running specialized soaring software, have been designed for use in gliders. Using GPS technology in conjunction with a barometric device these tools can:
 Provide the glider's position in 3 dimensions by a moving map display
 Alert the pilot to nearby airspace restrictions
 Indicate position along track and remaining distance and course direction
 Show airports within theoretical gliding distance
 Determine wind direction and speed at current altitude
 Show historical lift information
 Create a GPS log of the flight to provide proof for contests and gliding badges
 Provide "final" glide information (i.e., showing if the glider can reach the finish without additional lift).
 Indicate the best speed to fly under current conditions

After the flight the GPS data may be replayed on computer software for analysis and to follow the trace of one or more gliders against a backdrop of a map, an aerial photograph or the airspace.

Markings 
So that ground-based observers may identify gliders in flight or in gliding competition, registration marks ("insignias" or "competition numbers" or "contest ID") are displayed in large characters on the underside of a single wing, and also on the fin and rudder. Registration marks are assigned by gliding associations such as the US Soaring Society of America, and are unrelated to national registrations issued by entities such as the US Federal Aviation Administration. This need for visual ID has somewhat been supplanted by GPS position recording.  Insignias are useful in two ways:  First, they are used in radio communications between gliders, as pilots use their competition number as their call signs. Secondly, to easily tell a glider's contest ID when flying in close proximity to one another to alert them of potential dangers.  For example, during gatherings of multiple gliders within thermals (known as "gaggles"), one pilot might report "Six-Seven-Romeo I am right below you".

Fibreglass gliders are invariably painted white to minimise their skin temperature in sunlight. Fibreglass resin loses strength as its temperature rises into the range achievable in direct sun on a hot day. Color is not used except for a few small bright patches on wing tips; these patches (typically orange or red) improving a glider's visibility to pilots while in flight.  Such patches are obligatory for mountain flying in France. Non-fibreglass gliders made of aluminum or wood are not so subject to deterioration at higher temperatures and are often quite brightly painted.

Comparison of types 
There is sometimes confusion about gliders/sailplanes, hang gliders and paragliders. In particular, paragliders and hang gliders are both foot-launched. The main differences between the types are:

Competition classes 

Eight competition classes of glider have been defined by the FAI. They are:
 Standard Class (No flaps, 15 m wing-span, water ballast allowed)
 15 metre Class (Flaps allowed, 15 m wing-span, water ballast allowed)
 18 metre Class (Flaps allowed, 18 m wing-span, water ballast allowed)
 Open Class (No restrictions except a limit of 850 kg for the maximum all-up weight)
 Two Seater Class (maximum wing-span of 20 m), also known by the German name "Doppelsitzer"
 Club Class (This class allows a wide range of older small gliders with different performance, so the scores have to be adjusted by handicapping. Water ballast is not allowed).
 World Class (The FAI Gliding Commission which is part of the FAI and an associated body called Organisation Scientifique et Technique du Vol à Voile (OSTIV) announced a competition in 1989 for a low-cost glider, which had moderate performance, was easy to assemble and to handle, and was safe for low-hours pilots to fly. The winning design was announced in 1993 as the Warsaw Polytechnic PW-5. This allows competitions to be run with only one type of glider.)
 Ultralight Class, for gliders with a maximum mass less than 220 kg.

Major manufacturers 

A large proportion of gliders have been and are still made in Germany, the birthplace of the sport. In Germany there are several manufacturers but the three principal companies are:
 DG Flugzeugbau GmbH
 Schempp-Hirth GmbH
 Alexander Schleicher GmbH & Co
Germany also has Stemme and Lange Aviation. Elsewhere in the world, there are other manufacturers such as Jonker Sailplanes in South Africa, Sportinė Aviacija in Lithuania, Allstar PZL in Poland, Let Kunovice and HpH in the Czech Republic and AMS Flight in Slovenia.

See also 
 Glider types
 List of gliders
 Military glider
History
 Rhön-Rossitten Gesellschaft
 Schweizer brothers
Gliding as a sport
 Gliding
 Gliding competition
Other unpowered aircraft
 Rotor kite
 Unpowered aircraft
Unpowered flying toys and models
 Paper plane
 Radio-controlled glider

References

External links 

Information about all types of glider
  – An enthusiast's web-site that lists manufacturers and models of gliders, past and present.

FAI webpages
 FAI records – sporting aviation page with international world soaring records in distances, speeds, routes, and altitude
 

 
Glider aircraft
Sports equipment
Articles containing video clips